Vernon Parish School Board is a school district headquartered in Leesville, Louisiana, United States.

The district serves all of Vernon Parish.

School uniforms
All students are required to wear school uniforms.

Schools

PK-12 schools
 Evans High School (Unincorporated area)
 Hicks High School (Unincorporated area)
 Hornbeck High School (Hornbeck)
 Pitkin High School (Unincorporated area, Pitkin)
 Simpson High School (Simpson)

9-12 schools
 Leesville High School (Leesville)

7-12 schools
Zoned
 Anacoco High School (Anacoco)
 Pickering High School (Unincorporated area)
 Rosepine Junior/Senior High School (Rosepine)
Alternative
 Vernon Parish Optional School (Leesville)

7-8 schools
 Leesville Junior High School (Leesville)

PK-6 schools
 Anacoco Elementary School (Anacoco)
 Pickering Elementary School (Unincorporated area)
 Rosepine Elementary School (Rosepine)

5-6 schools
 Vernon Middle School (Leesville)

2-4 schools
 South Polk Elementary School (Fort Polk)
 West Leesville Elementary School (Leesville)

PK-1 schools
 East Leesville Elementary School (Leesville)
 North Polk Elementary School (Fort Polk)

References

External links

 Vernon Parish School District

School districts in Louisiana
School Board